Leo Barry (born 19 May 1977) is a retired Australian rules footballer in the Australian Football League (AFL) with the Sydney Swans.

Originally from Deniliquin, New South Wales, Barry attended Saint Ignatius' College, Riverview, before being drafted as a zone selection in the 1994 National Draft and making his debut in the final round of the 1995 season against Collingwood. For the next few seasons, he played in the forward line without consistency, struggling to find a place in an already strong forward line. He did, however, display an ability to take spectacular jumping marks, earning him the nickname "Leaping Leo".

In 2001, Swans coach Rodney Eade moved Barry to the backline, where he prospered. Despite being short for a full-back at 184 centimetres, he has successfully played on much taller opponents, making use of his leaping skills and using his body well. Regularly playing on opponents 10–15 cm taller than he is, Barry rarely had multiple goals kicked upon him. Barry's unique defensive ability was observed in 2004 when he kept 196-centimetre St Kilda full-forward Fraser Gehrig to two handballs for the whole game (for this effort, he received three Brownlow Medal votes).

Despite being only 184 centimetres tall, Barry was surprisingly strong, which was a useful attribute for him when facing taller opponents such as Fraser Gehrig, Brendan Fevola, David Neitz, Anthony Rocca, Chris Tarrant, Quentin Lynch, Matthew Lloyd, Jonathan Brown, Daniel Bradshaw and Matthew Richardson.

Barry has twice been included in the All-Australian team, in 2004 and 2005.

On 18 August 2009, Barry announced he would retire from football at the end of the 2009 season.

Barry is now a portfolio manager at Fairview Equity Partners.

"That Mark"
Barry will always be remembered as the player who "caught the cup" for the Swans. Not only did he ensure the victory for the Swans but Barry's backline heroics were instrumental to the Swans' success, which culminated with one of Barry's trademark spectacular marks during the 2005 AFL Grand Final between Sydney and West Coast. After a kick from Dean Cox was sent into the forward line, Barry marked in a big pack within the dying seconds of the game to secure the Swans' long-awaited premiership. Commentator Stephen Quartermain described the mark as follows:

"Cox throws it onto the left; one last roll of the dice for THE EAGLES! LEO BARRY, YOU STAR!...(siren in background)...The longest premiership drought in football history is over! For the first time in 72 years, the Swans are the champions of the AFL!"

This image was later used by Tabcorp for promotional purposes, and Barry sued for them using it without his permission, claiming that the image was "worth A$50,000". A confidential out-of-court settlement was reached. Since the court case, Barry has held the rights to the photo.

Statistics

|- style="background-color: #EAEAEA"
! scope="row" style="text-align:center" | 1995
|style="text-align:center;"|
| 21 || 1 || 1 || 0 || 6 || 2 || 8 || 4 || 0 || 1.0 || 0.0 || 6.0 || 2.0 || 8.0 || 4.0 || 0.0
|-
! scope="row" style="text-align:center" | 1996
|style="text-align:center;"|
| 21 || 5 || 2 || 0 || 13 || 10 || 23 || 5 || 8 || 0.4 || 0.0 || 2.6 || 2.0 || 4.6 || 1.0 || 1.6
|- style="background:#eaeaea;"
! scope="row" style="text-align:center" | 1997
|style="text-align:center;"|
| 21 || 10 || 12 || 9 || 67 || 39 || 106 || 30 || 13 || 1.2 || 0.9 || 6.7 || 3.9 || 10.6 || 3.0 || 1.3
|-
! scope="row" style="text-align:center" | 1998
|style="text-align:center;"|
| 21 || 16 || 9 || 6 || 82 || 62 || 144 || 38 || 16 || 0.6 || 0.4 || 5.1 || 3.9 || 9.0 || 2.4 || 1.0
|- style="background:#eaeaea;"
! scope="row" style="text-align:center" | 1999
|style="text-align:center;"|
| 21 || 17 || 10 || 8 || 127 || 96 || 223 || 88 || 16 || 0.6 || 0.5 || 7.5 || 5.6 || 13.1 || 5.2 || 0.9
|-
! scope="row" style="text-align:center" | 2000
|style="text-align:center;"|
| 21 || 17 || 15 || 5 || 112 || 76 || 188 || 63 || 18 || 0.9 || 0.3 || 6.6 || 4.5 || 11.1 || 3.7 || 1.1
|- style="background:#eaeaea;"
! scope="row" style="text-align:center" | 2001
|style="text-align:center;"|
| 21 || 19 || 1 || 1 || 143 || 92 || 235 || 84 || 35 || 0.1 || 0.1 || 7.5 || 4.8 || 12.4 || 4.4 || 1.8
|-
! scope="row" style="text-align:center" | 2002
|style="text-align:center;"|
| 21 || 13 || 0 || 0 || 89 || 75 || 164 || 43 || 28 || 0.0 || 0.0 || 6.8 || 5.8 || 12.6 || 3.3 || 2.2
|- style="background:#eaeaea;"
! scope="row" style="text-align:center" | 2003
|style="text-align:center;"|
| 21 || 24 || 0 || 2 || 182 || 151 || 333 || 133 || 56 || 0.0 || 0.1 || 7.6 || 6.3 || 13.9 || 5.5 || 2.3
|-
! scope="row" style="text-align:center" | 2004
|style="text-align:center;"|
| 21 || 23 || 0 || 0 || 139 || 148 || 287 || 107 || 34 || 0.0 || 0.0 || 6.0 || 6.4 || 12.5 || 4.7 || 1.5
|- style="background:#eaeaea;"
! scope="row" style="text-align:center" | 2005
|style="text-align:center;"|
| 21 || 26 || 0 || 0 || 213 || 128 || 341 || 152 || 37 || 0.0 || 0.0 || 8.2 || 4.9 || 13.1 || 5.8 || 1.4
|-
! scope="row" style="text-align:center" | 2006
|style="text-align:center;"|
| 21 || 25 || 0 || 1 || 224 || 147 || 371 || 173 || 39 || 0.0 || 0.0 || 9.0 || 5.9 || 14.8 || 6.9 || 1.6
|- style="background:#eaeaea;"
! scope="row" style="text-align:center" | 2007
|style="text-align:center;"|
| 21 || 18 || 4 || 0 || 145 || 131 || 276 || 116 || 36 || 0.2 || 0.0 || 8.1 || 7.3 || 15.3 || 6.4 || 2.0
|-
! scope="row" style="text-align:center" | 2008
|style="text-align:center;"|
| 21 || 20 || 2 || 0 || 149 || 154 || 303 || 125 || 35 || 0.1 || 0.0 || 7.5 || 7.7 || 15.2 || 6.3 || 1.8
|- style="background:#eaeaea;"
! scope="row" style="text-align:center" | 2009
|style="text-align:center;"|
| 21 || 3 || 0 || 0 || 20 || 23 || 43 || 14 || 3 || 0.0 || 0.0 || 6.7 || 7.7 || 14.3 || 4.7 || 1.0
|- class="sortbottom"
! colspan=3| Career
! 237
! 56
! 32
! 1711
! 1334
! 3045
! 1175
! 374
! 0.2
! 0.1
! 7.2
! 5.6
! 12.8
! 5.0
! 1.6
|}

References

External links 

1977 births
Living people
Australian rules footballers from New South Wales
Sydney Swans players
Sydney Swans Premiership players
All-Australians (AFL)
Deniliquin Football Club players
People from Deniliquin
Australia international rules football team players
One-time VFL/AFL Premiership players
People educated at Saint Ignatius' College, Riverview